Pinggui District is one of two urban districts of the city of Hezhou, Guangxi Zhuang Autonomous Region, China. The district lies in the western part of the city proper of Hezhou, it was formed from one subdistrict, one township and 7 towns of Babu District on 8 June 2016. Pinggui District is bordered by Zhongshan and Zhaoping Counties to the west, Cangwu County to the south, Babu District to the east, Jianghua County of Hunan Province and Fuchuan County to the north. Its seat is Xiwan Subdistrict.

References

County-level divisions of Guangxi
Administrative divisions of Hezhou